On 8 January 2023, Muhammad Fadli Sadewa, an 11-year-old, was the victim in a sadistic murder case in Makassar, Indonesia. He was found murdered under a bridge near Nipa-nipa Pond in Moncongloe, Maros Regency. The murderer, Muhammad Adrian, was convicted. News media was filled with reports of the murder and the child was interviewed by several media. A month after his body was discovered, media reported that his killer must have been selling organ parts.

Arrest and conviction
Soon a 17-year-old man, Muhammad Adrian, along with an 18-year-old man, Muhammad Faizal were arrested and interrogated. Both murderers did this on purpose since they were obsessed about becoming rich and were attempted to earn billions of money after seeing advertisements regarding the sale and purchase of human organs. They were also being scolded by their parents due to economic problems hence they find out to help the family economy.

From the CCTV footage, Muhammad Fadli Sadewa was picked up by Muhammad Adrian in front of an Indomaret store. However, after being picked up by the perpetrator who was riding a motorcycle, the victim didn't return to his home until he was pronounced dead. It was later revealed that they were doing this on purpose to sell the boy's organ at a high price. Both of them have been suspected and are being detained by Makassar Resort Police.

Aftermath
The murderer's family became the resident's ochlocracy target. They must be evicted and ejected from their current location where they live in and was destroyed. Then, they were forced to move to a boarding house after it was destroyed.

References

2023 in Indonesia
2023 murders in Indonesia
2023 scandals
Child abuse
Child murder
Indonesian murder victims
January 2023 crimes in Asia
January 2023 events in Indonesia